Democrata may refer to:

 Democrata Futebol Clube, a Brazilian football (soccer) club from Sete Lagoas
 Esporte Clube Democrata, a Brazilian football (soccer) club from Governador Valadares
 Democrata Party, Philippines; see 9th Philippine Legislature